Félix Désiré Dehèque (9 October 1794 in Paris - 17 December 1870 at Etretat) was a French scholar of Greek antiquity. He died during the siege of Paris.

Dehèque was a student of the Ecole Normale in 1813.

References
http://www.textesrares.com/philo19/noticeAuteur.php?nom_aut=Deh%E8que&prenom_aut=F%E9lix+%5BD%E9sir%E9%5D 

1794 births
1870 deaths
Hellenists
French male non-fiction writers